Luo Zhichuan (Lo Chih-ch'uan, traditional: 羅稚川, simplified: 罗稚川); was a Chinese landscape painter during the Yuan Dynasty (1271–1368). His specific dates of birth and death are not known.

Luo was born in Qingjiang (modern Huai'an) in the province of Jiangxi. He established a reputation for himself very early on in school and went on to become very well known in his time. He painted landscapes in the style of Guo Xi.

References

External links
Arts of Korea, an exhibition catalog from The Metropolitan Museum of Art Libraries (fully available online as PDF), which contains material on Luo Zhichuan
Sung and Yuan paintings, an exhibition catalog from The Metropolitan Museum of Art Libraries (fully available online as PDF), which contains material on Luo Zhichuan (see list of paintings)

Painters from Jiangxi
Year of death unknown
Yuan dynasty landscape painters
People from Yichun, Jiangxi
Year of birth unknown